Malene Winther Mortensen (born 23 May 1982) is a Danish singer.

She entered the Danish music scene in 2001, during the first season of Stjerne for en aften, the Danish edition of Star for a Night. She made it to the finals, with her rendition of Moloko's "Sing It Back". The following year, she entered the Dansk Melodi Grand Prix, the Danish national pre-selection for the Eurovision Song Contest.

In 2003 she released her debut album called Paradise. This album, revolving around modern jazz, was supported by three of Denmark's best known jazz musicians: Niels Lan Doky (piano), Niels-Henning Ørsted Pedersen (double bass) and Alex Riel (drums).

Discography
 Paradise (Universal Music, 2003)
 Date with a Dream (Stunt Records, 2005)
 Malene (Stunt, 2006)
 Desperado (Stunt, 2007)
 To All of You (Stunt, 2007)
 Agony & Ecstasy (Stunt, 2009)
 You Go to My Head (2012)
 Still in Love with You (Hitman Jazz, 2012) (released only in Thailand)
 Can't Help It (Stunt, 2015)
 You Belong To Me (Hitman Jazz, 2016)

References

External links

Official Malene Mortensen Homepage in Danish and English

1982 births
Living people
Eurovision Song Contest entrants for Denmark
Eurovision Song Contest entrants of 2002
Danish jazz singers
English-language singers from Denmark
Danish pop singers
21st-century Danish women singers
Stunt Records artists